is a Japanese heavy metal band that was formed in 1978 in Osaka. One of the first Japanese metal bands, they steered toward a poppier sound on later albums and dropped from worldwide view, preferring to record and tour in their home country. After a successful run, they broke up in 1994, but returned five years later and remain active.

The quintet from the nineties is still together. An early incarnation of the band included Minoru Niihara (of Loudness fame) as singer (originally bass and vocals).

Discography

Studio albums
 1983 - Earthshaker
 1984 - Fugitive
 1984 - Midnight Flight
 1985 - Passion
 1986 - Overrun
 1987 - Aftershock
 1988 - Smash
 1989 - Treachery
 1990 - Pretty Good!
 1992 - Earthshaker
 1993 - Real
 1993 - Yesterday & Tomorrow
 2001 - Birthday
 2003 - Soko-Ni Aru Shi
 2004 - Faith
 2007 - AIM
 2008 - Quarter
 2009 - The Course of Life
2010 - Back to Nexus 
 2011 - Pray for the Earth
2013 - The Earthshaker 
 2015 - Bird 
2018 - The Story Goes On

Singles
 1983 - Blondie Girl
 1984 - T-O-K-Y-O
 1984 - Exciting Mini
 1985 - ありがとう君に
 1985 - Exciting Mini 2
 1987 - Shaker's Shakies
 1987 - Shaker's Shakies (CD)

Live albums
 1986 - Live in Budokan
 1989 - Earthshaker Live Encore!
 1994 - More - Earthshaker in Vancouver
 1994 - Remains
2014 - 30th Anniversary Special Live

Compilations
 1987 - The Best of Earthshaker
 1988 - The Ballads of Earthshaker
 1995 - The Very Best of Earthshaker
 2002 - Golden Best
 2002 - The Best of Nexus Years
 2005 - 1987-1992 The Best

Video/DVD
 1984 - Midnight Flight
 1985 - Passion the Movie
 1987 - After Shock
 1990 - So Good

References

External links
Earthshaker Official Homepage
 Earthshaker@BNR Metal Pages

Japanese heavy metal musical groups
Musical groups established in 1978
Musical groups from Osaka